Mtusa may refer to:

Miss Teen USA
MT-USA, a 1980s music TV series from Ireland